Héctor Jose Valle (born October 27, 1940) is a Puerto Rican former professional baseball catcher, who played in Major League Baseball (MLB) for the Los Angeles Dodgers.

Professional career
Valle was signed by the Los Angeles Dodgers as an amateur free agent in 1960. His MLB career consists of the nine games he played for the  Dodgers, appearing six times behind the plate. Valle batted .308 (4-for-13), scoring one run, with two runs batted in (RBI), and achieving an on-base percentage of .400. Defensively, he handled 21 chances flawlessly for a fielding percentage of 1.000.

Valle's four major league hits (all singles) came against Denny Lemaster, Bob Veale, and Bob Sadowski.

Valle was later acquired by the New York Mets and Detroit Tigers, but never again appeared in another regular season big league game. He played in several other farm systems and the Mexican League, finally hanging up his spikes following the  season.

See also
 List of Major League Baseball players from Puerto Rico

External links

1940 births
Living people
Albuquerque Dodgers players
Albuquerque Dukes players
Bravos de Reynosa players
Cafeteros de Córdoba players
Dorados de Chihuahua players
Greenville Spinners players
Indios de Ciudad Juárez (minor league) players
Jacksonville Suns players
Kokomo Dodgers players
Los Angeles Dodgers players
Major League Baseball catchers
Major League Baseball players from Puerto Rico
Mexican League baseball players
Minor league baseball managers
Omaha Royals players
Pan American Games medalists in baseball
Pan American Games silver medalists for Puerto Rico
Puerto Rican expatriate baseball players in Mexico
People from Vega Baja, Puerto Rico
Reno Silver Sox players
Spokane Indians players
Toledo Mud Hens players
Baseball players at the 1959 Pan American Games
Medalists at the 1959 Pan American Games